Kani Rash (also Romanized as Kānī Rash and Kānī Resh) is a village in Khaneh Shur Rural District, in the Central District of Salas-e Babajani County, Kermanshah Province, Iran. At the 2006 census, its population was 276, in 60 families.

References 

Populated places in Salas-e Babajani County